E3 Saxo Bank Classic, previously known as E3 BinckBank Classic, E3 Harelbeke, Harelbeke–Antwerp–Harelbeke and E3-Prijs Vlaanderen, is an annual road cycling race in Flanders, Belgium. The race starts and finishes in Harelbeke, covering 203 kilometres, mainly in the Flemish Ardennes.

First raced in 1958, it is one of the more recently founded one-day classics, but has developed into a prestigious and desirable event. It is on the UCI World Tour calendar, as part of a series of cobbled classics in Belgium and Northern France in March and April.

Belgian Tom Boonen holds the record of victories with five wins, trailed by cycling icon Rik Van Looy who won four times.

Cobbled Classic

E3 Harelbeke is held on the last Friday of March and marks the start of the Flemish Cycling Week, starting a fortnight of WorldTour racing on the cobbles and bergs of Flanders. It is the second in the series of cobbled races in Belgium and northern France that take place over a two-week period from the Wednesday after Milan–San Remo until Paris–Roubaix. E3 Harelbeke is the race that resembles the Tour of Flanders the most.

In 2010, UCI made some calendar changes, most notably positioning the Pro Tour race Gent–Wevelgem on the day after E3 Harelbeke, causing a dispute between the two races. In 2012, when the E3 race was upgraded to World Tour status as well, organizers changed the date of their event to Friday to meet the demands of UCI, who requested a day of rest between two arduous World Tour events.

Because of its place on the calendar, the race has built a reputation as the final rehearsal for the more prestigious Tour of Flanders, the Flemish monument race coming nine days after the E3 Harelbeke. With a distance of 200–215 km, the E3 route is shorter than the Tour of Flanders, but addresses many of the same roads and hills of the Flemish Ardennes. With cobbles, steep climbs, winding and narrow roads, and often affected by wind, it offers all race circumstances that characterize Flemish classic races. Favourites for the Tour of Flanders often do well in Harelbeke, eager to win the race and using it as the perfect testing ground. Because of the similarities, Flemish media have dubbed the race The little Tour of Flanders.

History
The E3 Harelbeke was created in 1958. The first editions were raced from Harelbeke to Antwerp and back, hence the event was named Harelbeke-Antwerp-Harelbeke. Belgian cycling icon Rik Van Looy won the race four times in the 1960s. E3 does not refer to a race sponsor; the race was renamed E3-Prijs Harelbeke in the early 1960s, as a reference to the former European route E03, a series of European highways from Lisbon to Stockholm. The Belgian part of the E3 – now called E17 – connected Antwerp and Kortrijk, close to Harelbeke.

Although the race is much younger than many other cycling classics in Flanders, it quickly became a desirable entry for specialists of the cobbled races. Many winners on the roll of honour have also won the Tour of Flanders or Paris–Roubaix in their careers. Classics specialist Jan Raas won the race three consecutive times in the early 1980s. In the 1990s Johan Museeuw and Andrei Tchmil won their first important one-day races in Harelbeke, before winning cycling's most prestigious cobbled classics.

Since the first edition until 2011, the race was held on a Saturday in the weekend before the Tour of Flanders, forming a tandem with the Brabantse Pijl on Sunday. From 2005 until 2011 the race was part of the continental UCI Europe Tour, where it was classified as a 1.HC race. Belgian Tom Boonen, claiming four consecutive wins, and Swiss Fabian Cancellara were the main protagonists with some spectacular victories, and the event garnered a lot of prestige on the international calendar.

In 2012 the race was upgraded to World Tour level, cycling's highest level of professional races. Tom Boonen won the edition, setting a record of five victories, and the race was officially named E3 Harelbeke. In 2013 Fabian Cancellara claimed his third win after a long-distance attack on the Oude Kwaremont and a 35 km solo raid to the finish. The race has a reputation as a foremost cobbled classic. The race was rebranded E3 BinckBank Classic for the 2019 edition, following a sponsorship deal. The name change does not have consequences for the route, as the city of Harelbeke continues to host the start and finish of the race.

It was raced without interruption from its inception until the COVID-19 pandemic caused the cancellation of the 2020 edition.

Route
Usually a little over 200 kilometres long and always starting and finishing in Harelbeke, the E3 Harelbeke contains anything between 12 and 17 short, sharp, cobbled climbs, mainly in the last 90 kilometres. As usual in Flemish one-day racing, local knowledge can be crucial.

The race starts on Harelbeke's Grote Markt and travels east on mainly flat roads towards Oudenaarde and Zottegem. The riders reach the most easterly point in Ninove after 85 km, before returning west via Geraardsbergen, after which the race addresses the bergs and cobbled roads of the Flemish Ardennes in the south of East Flanders. The race unfolds in the hill zone with a succession of short, sharp climbs as the course loops between Ronse and Oudenaarde.

The last climbs in the Flemish Ardennes – Paterberg, Oude Kwaremont and Karnemelkbeekstraat – are notoriously difficult and the sites where the race tends to split apart for good; before the race re-enters West Flanders for a mainly flat run-in to the finish. The Tiegemberg, the last climb of the day, comes at 20 kilometres from the finish in Harelbeke.

Hills and cobbles
In 2017 there were 15 categorized hills. The climbs, in order of appearance, are Katteberg, La Houppe, Kruisberg, Côte de Trieu, Hotond, Kortekeer, Taaienberg, Boigneberg, Eikenberg, Stationsberg, Kapelberg, Paterberg, Oude Kwaremont, Karnemelkbeekstraat and Tiegemberg. The Paterberg is a cobbled 300m climb that averages 12.5%, while the Oude Kwaremont is 2200m, of which 1500m cobbled, with a gradient average of 4.2%. In addition to the climbs, there are four flat stretches of cobbled roads.

Winners

Multiple winners
Riders in italics are still active.

Wins per country

Statistics and trivia

 E3 Harelbeke is the only Flemish one-day cycling event at World Tour level that is not owned and organized by Flanders Classics.
 The fastest edition was the 2003 event, won by Dutchman Steven de Jongh in an average speed of 45.9 km/h.
 15 riders on the roll of honour, including all seven repeat winners, have also won the Tour of Flanders during their careers. In chronological order: Arthur Decabooter, Noël Foré, Rik Van Looy, Roger De Vlaeminck, Walter Planckaert, Jan Raas, Eric Vanderaerden, Eddy Planckaert, Johan Museeuw, Andrei Tchmil, Peter Van Petegem, Tom Boonen, Fabian Cancellara, Peter Sagan, Niki Terpstra and Kasper Asgreen. All of them, except Van Looy, have won E3 Harelbeke before their first or only Tour of Flanders win.
 9 riders won E3 Harelbeke and the Tour of Flanders in the same year: Noël Foré in 1963, Walter Planckaert in 1976, Jan Raas in 1979, Johan Museeuw in 1998, Peter Van Petegem in 1999, Tom Boonen in 2005, 2006 and 2012, Fabian Cancellara in 2010 and 2013, Niki Terpstra in 2018, and Kasper Asgreen in 2021.
 In 2012 the famed Muur van Geraardsbergen was included in the E3 Harelbeke for the first time. It was organizers' whimsical response to Flanders Classics' decision to exclude the climb from the Tour of Flanders, an action that caused great upheaval among Flanders' tradition-loving cycling aficionado's.
 8 winners of E3 Harelbeke have also won the world title: Rik Van Looy, Freddy Maertens, Jan Raas, Mario Cipollini, Johan Museeuw, Tom Boonen, Peter Sagan and Michał Kwiatkowski. Two of them won the race in the rainbow jersey as ruling world champions: Jan Raas in 1980 and Tom Boonen in 2006.
 In 2015 a publicity poster for the race caused severe controversy. The poster showed a woman's bare legs from behind, with a cyclist's gloved hand apparently going to pinch the woman's bottom. It was a reference to Peter Sagan's actions after the 2013 Tour of Flanders, when he pinched a podium miss' bottom during the after-race ceremony. The poster was considered "demeaning" and "misogynistic" and was criticized by the Belgian Jury of Advertising Ethics, forcing UCI to issue a statement disapproving the promotional poster and ordering the organisers to withdraw and replace it.
 Geraint Thomas, winner of the 2015 event, became the first Tour de France winner on the roll of honour, following his overall victory at the 2018 Tour de France. Five-fold Tour de France winner Eddy Merckx finished third in the 1971 race and second in 1972, but failed to win the event.
 In 2019 organisers were again forced to withdraw a controversial poster. The poster showed two bodypainted women entwined to form the figure of a frog, accompanied by the tagline: "Who shall crown himself prince in Harelbeke?" E3 organisers were roundly criticised again, forcing them to remove the graphics from all of its media.

References

External links

 
 

 
Cycle races in Belgium
UCI Europe Tour races
Recurring sporting events established in 1958
1958 establishments in Belgium
UCI World Tour races
Classic cycle races
Sport in Harelbeke